Our Lady & Saint Charles Borromeo Church is a Roman Catholic church in Wisbech, Cambridgeshire, England. Services are conducted in the English and Polish languages.

External links 
 Official website

Wisbech
Our Lady and Saint Charles Borromeo Church, Wisbech